Next is the fifth studio album by American singer and actress Vanessa Williams, released on August 26, 1997, by Mercury Records. It includes the singles "Happiness" (number 36 on the Hot R&B/Hip-Hop Singles and Tracks chart), "Who Were You Thinkin' 'Bout", "First Thing on Your Mind" and "Oh How the Years Go By" (number 6 on the Hot Adult Contemporary Tracks chart).

Track listing

Sample credits
 "Happiness" contains an interpolation of "I Can't Wait" by Nu Shooz.

Charts

Certifications

Notes

References

1997 albums
Albums produced by Jimmy Jam and Terry Lewis
Albums produced by R. Kelly
Albums recorded at Westlake Recording Studios
Hip hop soul albums
Mercury Records albums
Vanessa Williams albums